The Girl from Mexico is a 1939 American comedy film directed by Leslie Goodwins and written by Lionel Houser and Joseph Fields. The film stars Lupe Vélez, who plays a hot-headed, fast-talking Mexican singer taken to New York for a radio gig, who decides she wants the ad agency man for herself.

This low-budget film's unexpected box-office success resulted in a sequel, Mexican Spitfire, and eventually a film series of seven films all together.  All eight were directed by Goodwins, used venerable comedian Leon Errol as a comic foil, and showcased Vélez's comic persona, indulging in broken-English malapropisms, troublemaking ideas, sudden fits of temper, occasional songs, and bursts of Spanish invective. The film was released June 2, 1939, by RKO Radio Pictures.

Plot summary

Cast
 Lupe Vélez as Carmelita Fuentes
 Donald Woods as Dennis 'Denny' Lindsay
 Leon Errol as Uncle Matthew 'Matt' Lindsay
 Linda Hayes as Elizabeth Price
 Donald MacBride as L. B. Renner
 Edward Raquello as Tony Romano 
 Elisabeth Risdon as Aunt Della Lindsay
 Ward Bond as Mexican Pete, the Wrestler

References

External links
 
 
 
 

1939 films
Films directed by Leslie Goodwins
1939 comedy films
American comedy films
American black-and-white films
1930s American films